Bromus squarrosus, the rough brome, is a brome grass native to Russia and Europe. The specific epithet squarrosus is Latin, meaning "with spreading tips". The grass has a diploid number of 14.

Description

The culms are hollow and  bear four to five leaves with sheaths shorter than the blades. The leaf sheaths are pubescent and the leaf blades are typically pubescent but occasionally glabrous. The unilateral and lax panicles have few spreading or ascending branches that are erect in youth tend to nod at maturity. The densely flowered spikelets bear ten to twenty flowers each, with the base of the florets hidden at maturity. The glumes can be smooth or scabrous. The caryopses are just as long as the paleas, and are flat or slightly rolled inwards.

The long nine-ribbed palea and the oblong spikelets morphologically distinguish the species from most other Bromus species.

The grass flowers in June and July.

Habitat and distribution

Bromus squarrosus grows in overgrazed pastures, fields, and road verges. It prefers loamy or alluvial soils. It is native to central Russia and southern Europe, but is naturalized throughout southern Canada and the northern United States.

References

squarrosus
Plants described in 1753
Taxa named by Carl Linnaeus